The 1983 Buckeye Tennis Classic, also known as the Columbus Open, was a men's tennis tournament played on outdoor hardcourts at the Buckeye Boys Ranch in Grove City, a suburb of Columbus, Ohio in the United States that was part of the 1983 Volvo Grand Prix circuit. It was the 14th edition of the tournament and was held  from August 1 through August 7, 1983. Sixth-seeded Brian Teacher won the singles title, his second at the event after 1981, and earned $20,000 first-prize money.

Finals

Singles
 Brian Teacher defeated  Bill Scanlon 7–6, 6–4
 It was Teacher's 2nd singles title of the year and the 8th and last of his career.

Doubles
 Scott Davis /  Brian Teacher defeated  Vijay Amritraj /  John Fitzgerald 6–1, 4–6, 7–6(16–14)

References

External links
 ITF tournament edition details

Buckeye Tennis Championships
Buckeye Tennis Championships
Buckeye Tennis Championships
Buckeye Tennis Championships